Maria Eduarda Francelino da Silva (born 18 July 1995), known as Duda, is a Brazilian professional footballer who plays as a forward for Campeonato Brasileiro de Futebol Feminino Série A1 club Flamengo and the Brazil women's national team.

References

1995 births
Living people
Sportspeople from Pernambuco
Brazilian women's footballers
Women's association football forwards
Associação Desportiva Centro Olímpico players
Sport Club Corinthians Paulista (women) players
Toppserien players
Avaldsnes IL players
Brazil women's international footballers
São Paulo FC (women) players
Expatriate women's footballers in Norway
Brazilian expatriate sportspeople in Norway
Footballers at the 2020 Summer Olympics
Olympic footballers of Brazil
Clube de Regatas do Flamengo (women) players
Associação Acadêmica e Desportiva Vitória das Tabocas players
Brazilian expatriate women's footballers